The following is a list of films belonging to the neo-noir genre. Following a common convention of associating the 1940s and 1950s with film noir, the list takes 1960 to date the beginning of the genre.

List of films: 1960–1969

List of films: 1970–1979

List of films: 1980–1989

List of films: 1990–1999

List of films: 2000–2009

List of films: 2010–2019

List of films: 2020–2029

See also
 List of film noir titles

References

Bibliography
 Ballinger, Alexander; Graydon, Danny (2007). The Rough Guide to Film Noir. London & New York: Rough Guides. .
 Conard, Mark T.; ed. (2009). The Philosophy of Neo-Noir. Lexington: University Press of Kentucky. .
 Hogan, David J. (2013). Film Noir FAQ: All That's Left to Know About Hollywood's Golden Age of Dames, Detectives, and Danger. Milwaukee, WI: Hal Leonard. .
 Mayer, Geoff; McDonnell, Brian (2007). Encyclopedia of Film Noir. Westport, CT: Greenwood Press. .
 Naremore, James (2008). More Than Night: Film Noir in Its Contexts (2d ed.). Berkeley, Los Angeles, and London: University of California Press. .

 Selby, Spencer (1984). Dark City: The Film Noir. Jefferson, N.C. & London: McFarland Publishing. .
 Silver, Alain; Ward, Elizabeth; eds. (1992). Film Noir: An Encyclopedic Reference to the American Style (3rd ed.). Woodstock, New York: The Overlook Press. .
 Silver, Alain; Ward, Elizabeth; Ursini, James; Porfirio, Robert; eds. (2010). Film Noir: The Encyclopedia. New York & London: Overlook/Duckworth. .
 Spicer, Andrew (2002). Film Noir. Harlow, UK: Longman/Pearson Education. .
 Spicer, Andrew (2010). Historical Dictionary of Film Noir. Lanham, MD: Scarecrow Press. .
 Spicer, Andrew; Hanson, Helen (2013). A Companion to Film Noir. Oxford: Wiley-Blackwell. .
 Williams, Tony (2017). Hong Kong Neo-Noir. Yau, Esther (ed.). Edinburgh University Press. .

History of film
Lists of films by genre